Alexander (II) Mavrocordatos (1 July 1754 – 8 February 1819), surnamed Firaris (Φιραρής) was a Phanariote who served as Prince of Moldavia from 1785 to 1786.

Life 
Alexander was the son of John II Mavrocordatos, and served as Grand Dragoman from 1782 to 1785, before being Hospodar (Prince) of Moldavia from January 1785 to December 1786, succeeding his cousin Alexander I Mavrocordatos.

During the Russo-Turkish War of 1787–1792 he sided with the Russian Empire, which began to pose as a protector of Christians in the Balkans. At the end of the war he fled to Russia, whence his nickname ("firari" meaning "fugitivie" in Turkish). He obtained the title of Russian Prince and died in Moscow on February 8, 1819.

Alexander II Mavrocordatos had married Zaphira or Zamfira Caradja. The couple had only one daughter who became maid of honour to the Empress Catherine II of Russia.

Sources 
 Alexandru Dimitrie Xenopol Histoire des Roumains de la Dacie trajane : Depuis les origines jusqu'à l'union des principautés. E Leroux Paris (1896).
 Alexandre A.C. Sturdza L'Europe Orientale et le rôle historique des Maurocordato (1660–1830) Librairie Plon Paris (1913), p. 255-266.
Nicolae Iorga Histoire des Roumains et de la romanité orientale. (1920)
  Constantin C. Giurescu & Dinu C. Giurescu, Istoria Românilor Volume III (depuis 1606), Editura Științifică și Enciclopedică, București, 1977.
 Mihail Dimitri Sturdza, Dictionnaire historique et généalogique des grandes familles de Grèce, d'Albanie et de Constantinople, M.-D. Sturdza, Paris, chez l'auteur, 1983 .
 Jean-Michel Cantacuzène, Mille ans dans les Balkans, Éditions Christian, Paris, 1992. 
 Gilles Veinstein, Les Ottomans et la mort (1996) .
 Joëlle Dalegre Grecs et Ottomans 1453-1923. De la chute de Constantinople à la fin de l'Empire Ottoman, L'Harmattan Paris (2002)  .
 Jean Nouzille La Moldavie, Histoire tragique d'une région européenne, Ed. Bieler (2004), .
 Traian Sandu, Histoire de la Roumanie, Perrin (2008).
Familiile boierești române / Octav-George Lecca / Ediție îngrijită de Alexandru Condeescu București, Fundația culturală Libra / Editura Muzeul Literaturii Române, /  page 639

Rulers of Moldavia
1754 births
1819 deaths
Mavrocordatos family
18th-century Greek people
19th-century Greek people
Dragomans of the Porte
Constantinopolitan Greeks